László Huzsvár (21 February 1931 – 10 December 2016) was a Serbian-born Hungarian Roman Catholic bishop.

Life 

Huzsvár was born in Horgoš and was ordained to the priesthood on 29 June 1958. On 7 January 1988, he was appointed bishop of the Roman Catholic Diocese of Zrenjanin and ordained as bishop on 14 February 1988. He retired on 30 June 2007.

Death 
Huzsvár died on 10 December 2016 in Subotica at the age of 85.

References

1931 births
2016 deaths
People from Kanjiža
21st-century Roman Catholic bishops in Serbia
Serbian people of Hungarian descent
Hungarians in Vojvodina
20th-century Roman Catholic bishops in Serbia